Guiyang, historically rendered as Kweiyang, is the capital of Guizhou province of the People's Republic of China. It is located in the center of the province, situated on the east of the Yunnan–Guizhou Plateau, and on the north bank of the Nanming River, a branch of the Wu River. At the 2020 census, its population was 5,987,018, out of whom 4,506,134 lived in the six urban districts.

A city with humid subtropical climate, Guiyang is surrounded by mountains and forest. The area, inhabited since at least the Spring and Autumn period, formally became the capital of the surrounding province in 1413, during the Yuan dynasty. The city is home to a large Miao and Bouyei ethnic minority population. Guiyang has a diversified economy, traditionally a center for aluminum production, phosphate mining, and optical instrument manufacturing. Following reforms, the majority of the city's economic output in the services sector. Since 2015, it has seen targeted investments into big data and quickly emerged as a local innovation hub.

Guiyang is one of the top 500 science cities in the world by scientific research outputs, as tracked by the Nature Index. The city is also home to Guizhou University, a national research university under the Project 211 and under the Double First Class Status in certain disciplines.

History

The valley approximating present-day Guiyang has been inhabited since the Spring and Autumn period. Guiyang was a 7th-century military outpost under the Sui and Tang, when the area around it was known as Juzhou. It grew into a city named Shunyuan under the Mongolian Yuan dynasty sometime between their 1279 southwestern campaigns and 1283. By the time Guizhou became a full province in 1413, its capital at Guiyang was also known as Guizhou. It became a prefectural seat under the Ming and Qing. Guiyang grew rapidly during the development of the southwest that occurred after the Japanese invasion of China during World War II. It has also grown rapidly since Deng Xiaoping's economic reforms reached it in the 1990s.

Geography
The city's heart is around the Dashizi, a "big cross", and Penshuichi (literally "Fountain Pool"), a traffic intersection, in the center of which there was a large fountain until early 2010, when it was paved over for better traffic.

Climate
Guiyang has a four-season, monsoon-influenced humid subtropical climate (Köppen: Cwa), tempered by its low latitude and high elevation. It has cool winters and moderate-temperature summers; the majority of the year's  of precipitation occurs from May to July. Rain is common throughout the year, with occasional flurries in winter. With monthly possible sunshine ranging from 12% in January to 41% in August, the city receives only 1150 hours of sunshine, making it one of China's least sunny major cities. Average monthly relative humidity is consistently above 75% throughout the year.
The moderate temperature together with other factors including air quality, wind speed, etc. made Guiyang to be ranked No.2 in the "Top 10 Summer Capitals of China".

Administrative divisions

The entire Guiyang municipality currently consists of six districts, one county-level city and three counties. The districts are Nanming, Yunyan, Huaxi, Wudang, Baiyun and Guanshanhu. The county-city is Qingzhen and the counties are Kaiyang, Xifeng and Xiuwen. The Gui'an New District, a non-administrative economic project, is situated to the southwest of Guiyang. It crosses over into areas under the jurisdiction of the neighboring city of Anshun.

Economy

Guiyang is the economic and commercial hub of Guizhou Province. In 2017, GDP for the Guiyang region totaled 353.8 billion yuan, with per capita GDP of 74,493 yuan ($10,720); the local economy is growing at the approximate pace of 10% per year. The city is also a large center for retail and wholesale commercial activities with operations of major domestic and international general retailers such as Wal-Mart, Carrefour, RT-Mart, Beijing Hualian, Parkson, and Xingli Group as well as consumer electronics and appliance sellers Gome and Suning. Wholesale operations include large regional produce, furniture, and industrial and construction machinery depots. Wal-Mart's southwest China regional vegetable and produce distribution center is located in Guiyang. Foreign brands have penetrated Guiyang rapidly, including McDonald's, Burger King, H&M, and Starbucks. Most of the time, they are located near the various shopping centers. The largest shopping centers are Hunter city plaza, Huaguoyuan Shopping Center, and Nanguohuajing.

Hydro-electric power generators are located along the city's main rivers including the Wu River. By 2007, the city's hydro electric plants supplied over 70% of the city's electricity. Coal is mined in the locality of Guiyang and Anshun, and there are large thermal generating plants at Guiyang and Duyun, supplying electricity for a portion of the city's industry. A large iron and steel plant came into production in Guiyang in 1960, supplying the local machinery-manufacturing industry.

Guiyang has a sizable domestic pharmaceuticals industry, producing traditional Chinese as well as Western medicines. Guiyang has also completed the first stage of city-wide free WiFi.

In 2016, Guiyang was named as the Best-Performing City in China by the Milken Institute owing to the city's "growth in jobs, wages, gross domestic product (GDP)." Guizhou Province saw the third-fastest growth among China's 31 regional districts in the first half of the year, growing by 10.5%. This growth is attributed to Guiyang's investments in computing and big data. Due to tax incentives and state support, multinational corporations such as Foxconn, Microsoft, Huawei, Hyundai Motor, Tencent, Qualcomm and Alibaba have opened offices in Guiyang.

Demographics

Guiyang is populated by 23 different minorities, the most populous of which is the Miao people and ethnic Han.

, the total population of Guiyang municipality was 4.3 million, among which 2.9 million were urban residents.

Culture

Language
Besides ethnic minority languages such as Miao and Bouyei, the people of Guiyang speak a variety of Southwestern Mandarin. It differs from common Mandarin for the retroflex sounds it lacks. Compared to Mandarin which has five tones (four and a non-stressed tone), Guiyang's local language only has three tones. Many old characters from ancient China are still used within Guiyang's language, which sound like Korean or Japanese. For example, "" (to go) is pronounced as “kèi”, fourth tone, instead of the Mandarin pronunciation “qù” and 做（to do） is pronounced as “zo”， fourth tone，rather than the Mandarin pronunciation "zuo".

Cuisine
Provinces in China are known for the different specialities they offer, and Guiyang is most known for its spicy food as well as the following dishes:
 Gaoba porridge , a sweet dessert. 
 Fish in sour soup , a Miao dish with roasted fish and various vegetables.
 Huangba , a sweet wrap made of rice that can be steamed or fried
 Huaxi Vermicelli , a dish that consists of beef vermicelli, that is frequently eaten as a breakfast in Guiyang.
 Siwawa , a dish that can be vegetarian or a mix of pork scraps and vegetables, where the ingredients are enclosed in rice wraps.
 Ice jelly with sesame seeds and peanuts , usually eaten in summer, with siwawa or barbecue 
 Intestines and blood noodles , made up with pig's intestines and pig's blood. 
 Qingyan's pig's feet , mostly found in the old town of Qingyan, pig's feet symbolize good luck.

Tourism

Being the capital of Guizhou, a very old and traditional province of China, Guiyang is shaped by its history, and still possesses many historical sites that attract many tourists:	
 The Jiaxiu Pavilion: The Jiaxiu Pavilion is located in the southern tip of the Guiyang Nanming River, which is the city's emblem and its symbol. It was initially built in 1598 during the Ming Dynasty and was destroyed multiple times in history. It was being rebuilt most recently in 1982.
 Qingyan Ancient Town:  Qingyan Ancient Town is located in the southern tip of Guiyang. It was originally built in the year 1378, during the Ming Dynasty. It is known its beautiful Chinese ancient architecture.
 Xifeng Concentration Camp: Xifeng Concentration Camp was the largest, highest-level prison of all the prisons set up by the Military commission of the KMT government during the Second Sino-Japanese War in 1937, and it was added by the state council to the list of major historical and cultural sites under state protection, in 1988.
 Confucian Center: the Confucian center is a non-public and educational organization affiliated with the Ministry of Education of the People's Republic of China. The Confucius Institute promotes and teaches Chinese culture and language around the world. The Confucian Temple, in the center of Qufu city, was built in 478 BC.
Xifeng Hot Spring: Xifeng Hot Spring is located in the northeast of Xifeng County. The hot spring is surrounded by many mountains, upon which rich slopes grow a profusion of pines, firs, bamboos and other plants. This beautiful place has offered its advantages for sanatoriums, hospitals and villas.
 Qianling Park: Qianling Park, in the northwest part of Guiyang, takes its name from Mount Qianling, which is known as southern Guizhou's most majestic mountain. The park is covered with thick vegetation and old trees, with more than 1,500 types of flowers and trees, and at least 1,000 types of Medicinal herbs. The Hongfu Temple, built toward the end of the Ming dynasty and the beginning of the Qing Dynasty, is one of Guizhou's most famous temples.
Huaxi National Wetland Park: Guiyang Huaxi national urban wetland Park is located in the north of downtown Guiyang's Huaxi district. It is one of the only urban Wetlands in the country. On the environmental aspect, it belongs to a subtropical humid climate of the plateau karst hilly region, based on Karst landform characteristics of the urban wetland park, its unique geographical location and geological structure form a rich variety of landscapes resources.

Nightlife
 Pubs and bars
he most dynamic street in Guiyang is Qianling Donglu, unironically called "Drinking Street", for the diversity and great numbers of pubs and bars that occupy it. In the province where Moutai comes from, an internationally well-known liquor, drinking tends to be a tradition. In Guiyang, beers are poured in small cups, and games – with dice or cards - are often necessary in order to drink.

 Night markets
When the night comes, street food flourishes everywhere in Guiyang, with its barbecue, grills and roasts. On Shaanxi Lu, one can find mutton chops, baked snail, roast chicken. On Bo'ai Lu mutton patties, beef pounder, glutinous rice, noodle rice, combine western and eastern food. On Xiaoshizi, the crispy fried duck.

 Night gaming traditions
At night, the elderly usually prefer to indulge in outdoor games, games that are often quite ancient:
Mahjong: a game made of bamboo, bone or plastics, each mahjong set consisting 136 tiles (about 3000 years old).
Spinning top: A game mostly played by old men in public squares, that consists in whipping, with a cable, a kind of spinning top. 
Square dancing: middle aged and elderly people dance in the square to relax or exercise.

Transport 
Transportation in Guiyang consists of an extensive network of roads, railways, river and air transport as well as public transportation system with bus system and many taxis.

Air
Guiyang is one of the important air transport hubs in Southwest China. Guiyang's main airport is the Guiyang Longdongbao International Airport (KWE) opened on May 28, 1997. In 2017, the airport handled over 18 million passengers; this is a three-fold increase in passenger traffic from 2010.

Metro

Guiyang Metro began construction in 2011. Line 1 began operation in December 2017. Line 2 began operation in April 2021.

Railway
Guiyang is a railway hub in southwest China. The Guizhou–Guangxi Railway (built in 1959, modified 2009), the Sichuan–Guizhou Railway (completed 1965), the Guiyang–Kunming Railway (completed 1970), and the Hunan–Guizhou Railway (completed 1975) intersect at Guiyang Railway Station. This main southern railway station was rebuilt in 2008.

Since 2008, the city has seen rapid development of high-speed rail. The Guiyang–Guangzhou High-Speed Railway, Shanghai–Kunming high-speed railway and Chongqing–Guiyang high-speed railway began operations in quick succession. The explosion of high-speed rail development has dramatically decreased travel times to nearly all first-tier Chinese cities, including Beijing (8 hours), Shanghai (9 hours), Guangzhou (4.5 hours), Chengdu (4 hours) and Chongqing (~2 hours). The high speed railway lines provide rapid freight service from two rail yards, and passenger service from Guiyang North railway station, in the city's Guanshanhu District.

Expressway
The city is located at the junction of four major segments of the national highway grid: the Gui–Huang, Gui–Zun, Gui–Bi, and Gui–Xin Expressways. The Gui-Huang Expressway (G60) links Guiyang with the cities and tourist areas of central and western Guizhou including Anshun, Guanling, and the Huangguoshu Waterfall. The expressway continues west to Yunnan Province as the Gui-Kun Expressway and terminates at Yunnan's capital city of Kunming. G75 Lanzhou–Haikou Expressway runs north  to Zunyi and is the most heavily travelled major highway in Guiyang. G76 Xiamen–Chengdu Expressway links Guiyang with the regional cities of Bijie and Dafang in northwest Guizhou province, southeastern Sichuan province, and the Sichuan cities of Luzhou, Neijiang, and Chengdu—Sichuan's provincial capital. The Gui–Xin Expressway (G60, G75) runs east and southeast through the Guangxi Zhuang Autonomous Region (G76), passing through Guilin, before entering Guangdong, and terminating at Guangzhou. The China National Highway 210 also runs through Guiyang via Xifeng and Longli.

In 2009 Guiyang added a modern orbital expressway to its highway network. The Guiyang Outer Ring Road (Guiyang Orbital Highway) opened in December 2009 and is a six- to eight-lane divided high-speed expressway that provides efficient links to and from large employment centers in the Jinyang New District, Baiyun District, Huaxi District, the Guiyang Longdongbao International Airport, the major multi-lane national highways, and the city's main roadways, allowing vehicular traffic to circumnavigate the heavy traffic of the city's inner city areas.

Education
The city has a university, a teacher-training college, a medical school, and 224 primary and middle schools.

Guizhou University 
Guizhou Normal University 
Guizhou Medical University 
Guizhou University of Finance and Economics 
Guizhou Nationalities University 
Guizhou Institute of Technology

Guiyang College of Traditional Chinese Medicine

Religion
Qianming Temple was first established in the 17th century, in the late Ming Dynasty and is located in Nanming District of Guiyang. 

On October 15, 1696, the city was made the seat of the Roman Catholic Apostolic Vicariate of Kweichow.  This was suppressed in 1715 and restored in 1846.  In 1924 it was renamed as the Apostolic Vicariate of Guiyang, and in 1946 it was promoted to its current status as the Roman Catholic Archdiocese of Guiyang.

Gallery

See also 
 List of twin towns and sister cities in China
 Guiyang biota

References

External links

 Guiyang Government website 
 Guiyang Government website 

 
1283 establishments in Asia
13th-century establishments in China
Cities in Guizhou
National Forest Cities in China
Provincial capitals in China
Prefecture-level divisions of Guizhou